Arthur J. Johnson (born 1886) was an English footballer active prior to the First World War.

A half-back, Johnson's earliest known club was Southend United, then playing in the Southern League. He had a spell with Sheffield United of The Football League, but only made two appearances for the "Blades". He then returned to Southend before joining another Southern League club, New Brompton, making his debut against Watford on 25 December 1909. He remained with the club until competitive football was abandoned in 1915 due to the escalation of the First World War, finishing with a total of 132 Southern League appearances and five goals.

He served as secretary-manager of Grays Thurrock United in the mid-1920s.

References

1886 births
Southend United F.C. players
Sheffield United F.C. players
Gillingham F.C. players
English Football League players
Year of death missing
English footballers
Association football midfielders